The Chesapeake Ranch Estates (CRE), also known locally as the Ranch Club, is located in Lusby, Maryland, United States, in southern Calvert County. CRE was founded in 1958 and is governed by a homeowners' association, which is officially called the "Property Owner's Association of the Chesapeake Ranch Estates" (POACRE). Today, CRE is composed of over 4,000 homes. The community is counted as a census-designated place for population statistics, with a residential population of 10,519 as of the 2010 census. At the 2000 census, the area was part of the Chesapeake Ranch Estates-Drum Point CDP.

Demographics

Amenities 
The CRE is close to the attractions of Solomons Island as well as in proximity to Naval Air Station Patuxent River. There are several public schools within a ten-mile radius of the community. The community maintains two private Chesapeake Bay beaches: Driftwood Beach and Seahorse Beach, and one manmade lake: Lake Lariat. CRE has a small airfield, a horseshoes field, a duck pond, and a camp ground. 
CRE is also home to part of the world-famous Calvert Cliffs. The cliffs are made of sand and clay with clearly visible layers. Over 600 species of fossils have been identified from all of Calvert Cliffs. The cliffs are easily accessible from Seahorse Beach but are off-limits due to the danger of collapse.

CRE is an unincorporated community protected 24/7 by security guards. Today, access to the beaches and other similar amenities is closed to non-members, however access to the roads around the community are open to all.

Current issues 
Currently POACRE was approved by request to become a special tax district in the county, that would raise an estimated $5,750,000 needed to repair the roads.
 	
Lake Lariat has a history of pollution ranging from runoff, to algae blooms, and also mercury. An ongoing effort has been made to clean the lake, and freshwater clams have been placed in the lake to help alleviate the problems. The lake also has an ongoing fish consumption advisory since 2002 by the Maryland Department of the Environment due to confirmed high levels of mercury in fish tissue in the lake, five times past the legally allowable, as all fish in Maryland have this advisory.

Recently, a growing movement has occurred to restructure POACRE or even make it a public subdivision as a solution to the growing numbers of problems that the original homeowners' association was not designed to handle when originally conceived. The campgrounds have been opened up to allow camping from the public.

There have been some discussions concerning the governing documents of the POACRE. This matter was the subject of litigation in the case of Hanson vs. Calvert County, won by Calvert County and its co-defendant, Property Owners of Chesapeake Ranch Estates. It was alleged in this case that in 1989 the founders of POACRE illegally co-opted the powers of the developer (Chesapeake Ranch Club, Inc.) as declarant of the covenants.

References

External links
Property Owners Association of Chesapeake Ranch Estates
homeowners battle time,beetle

Census-designated places in Maryland
Census-designated places in Calvert County, Maryland
Lusby, Maryland